Vendicata! (i. e. "Vindicated!") is a 1955 Italian melodrama film written and directed by Giuseppe Vari and starring Milly Vitale and Alberto Farnese.  It grossed 300 million lire at the Italian box office.

Plot

Cast 

Milly Vitale as Anna
Alberto Farnese as Roberto 
Gino Buzzanca
Beniamino Maggio
Giulio Donnini
Carla Calò
Erminio Spalla
Dina De Santis
Jula De Palma
Teddy Reno
Gino Latilla

References

External links

Italian war drama films
1950s war drama films
Films directed by Giuseppe Vari
Italian World War II films
1950s Italian films